Elections to Rochford Council, Essex, England, were held on 6 May 1999.  One third of the council was up for election and the council stayed under no overall control.

After the election, the composition of the council was
Liberal Democrat 13
Labour 12
Conservative 11
Residents 3
Independent 1

Election result

Ward results

Ashingdon

Barling & Sutton

Canewdon

Foulness & Great Wakering East

Grange & Rawreth

Great Wakering Central

Great Wakering West

Hawkwell East

Hawkwell West

Lodge

Trinity

Wheatley

Whitehouse

References

1999
1999 English local elections
1990s in Essex